Escándalos (Scandals), is a Spanish-language television series written by César Sierra. The pilot episode of the series was released on August 14, 2014 in Televen, before the premiere of the telenovela Avenida Brasil. The pilot episode starred Nohely Arteaga and Miguel de León.

The series was released on 7 September 2015, Televen premieres a new episode every Monday. In Venezuela it is known as Escándalos and the rest of the world as Escándalos: Todo es real excepto sus nombres.

Plot 
The series focuses his plot into a scandal in each of its separate chapters walks through several themes of the social environment, such as family, money and the laws.

Cast 
Nohely Arteaga as Gabriela Rellán
Miguel de León as Cristóbal Rellán
Zully Montero
Scarlet Ortiz
Yul Bürkle
Antonio Delli
Daniel Lugo
Paulo César Quevedo
Eduardo Serrano
Michelle Posada
Ricardo Álamo
Miguel Varoni

Series overview

Episodes

Pilot (2014)

References

External links 

Televen original programming
2015 Venezuelan television series debuts
Spanish-language television shows